Grande Otelo (October 18, 1915 – November 26, 1993) was the stage name of Brazilian actor, comedian, singer, and composer Sebastião Bernardes de Souza Prata. Otelo was born in Uberlândia, and was orphaned as a child. He kept running away from the families that adopted him; only when he took up art did his life become settled.

Grande Otelo started his film career in 1935 in the movie Noites Cariocas. He was also renowned for the comic duo he formed with Oscarito.

He died, aged 78, in Charles de Gaulle Airport, near Paris, France and was buried in São Pedro cemetery in Uberlândia, Brazil

Biography

1920: Childhood and youth 
Otelo was the son of Antenor Prata and Maria das Dores de Souza. His father, who was a cowboy, died when Sebastião was only two years old. According to the actor himself, his career in acting began a few short years after in UIberlândia in 1924 in a circus ring:"To me, the first entry that I made was beautiful because I was already a city clown, with my young age. Therefore, in that day the circus was full to see Bastiãozinho (...). I was about seven years old...Bastiãozinho dressed in a long dress and a pillow on the butt, wiggling arm in arm with the clown. Everyone laughed, everyone found it funny..."When the young boy was eight years old, his mother gave him up for adoption and he was taken to São Paulo . In the city, he fled from his adopted family a few times, which always led him to the juvenile court. In 1927, though still a child, he participated in the Companhia Negra de Revistas which was funded by Jayme Silva and the black artist De Chocolat who also had had Pixinguinha as a conductor. His presentations quickly became well known, leading to the following quote from the Jornal do Comércio (Newspaper of Commerce):"As part of the cast as a great attraction the great Othelo, a little six year old artist, is a real astonishment. The great little artist sings in diverse languages, with a verve and an extraordinary spontaneity. Newspapers of São Paulo and many other citys have called him the greatest artist of the Portuguese language."After a few escape attempts, he passed from tutor to tutor until being adopted by the family of the politician Antonio de Queiroz. Otelo then studied at the Heart of Jesus Lyceum until he was in junior high.

Personal life 
His life was full of a variety of tragedies. His father died from a stabbing before Grande Otelo was born and his mother was an alcoholic. In 1948, he officially married his first companion Lucia Maria Pinheiro. In the following year, Lucia shot the six year old child and then killed herself. In 1954, Otelo married for a second time, this time to Olga Vasconcellos. He remained in a relationship with her for 20 years. His final marriage was to a dancer named Joséphine Helene, which lasted 13 years.

He had four children, one of whom also became an actor: José Prata ("O Pratinha"), who initiated his artistic career at 14. He acted in the 1986 version of the soap opera Sinhá Moça (in the role of Bentinho) in addition to participating in the sitcom As Aventuras do Tio Maneco, and in the plays "O Pagador de Promessas" and “A Turma do Pererê”. In the 2010s, Pratinha worked as a cellphone repairman. Another of Otelo's Children, Carlos Sebastião Vasconcelos Prata, had become homeless around the same time.

Effects of racism on his career 
Grande Otelo is seen by many as a great success story. He is widely known today because of the prolific nature of his acting career. However, his career was marked by racism and prejudice. In one of his first roles, that of Sebastião in the film Onde Estás Felicidade, Grande Otelo's character is subject to many racial stereotypes. Incorrect stereotypes were a theme in many of his works, even well into his later years. Additionally, Grande Otelo faced prejudice against his acting abilities. It was and still is difficult to obtain leading roles for black actors. The leading roles that he managed to secure were all shared with a white co-star.

Selected filmography 

 Noites Cariocas (1936)
 João Ninguém (1936)
 Onde Estás Felicidade? (1939) - Sebastião
 Futebol em Família (1939) - Gibi
 Laranja da China (1940) - Boneco de Piche
 Pega Ladrão (1940)
 Céu azul (1941) - Chocolate
 A Sedução do Garimpo (1941)
 Samba in Berlin (1943)
 Caminho do Céu (1943)
 Tristezas Não Pagam Dívidas (1943)
 Moleque Tião (1943) - Tião
 Berlin to the Samba Beat (1944)
 Romance Proibido (1944) - Molecote
 Não Adianta Chorar (1945)
 O Gol da Vitória (1945) - Laurindo
 Segura Esta Mulher (1946) - Olho Vivo
 Fantasma Por Acaso (1946)
 Luz dos Meus Olhos (1947)
 Este Mundo É um Pandeiro (1947)
 Terra Violenta (1948)
 E o Mundo se Diverte (1948)
 É com Este Que Eu Vou (1948) - Lamparina
 Também Somos Irmãos (1949) - Moleque Miro
 O Caçula do Barulho (1949)
 Carnaval no Fogo (1949)
 Não É Nada Disso (1950)
 Aviso aos navegantes (1950) - Azulão
 Três Vagabundos (1952) - Rapadura / Milk Shake
 Barnabé Tu És Meu (1952) - Abdula
 Amei um Bicheiro (1953) - Passarinho
 The Terrible Twosome (1953) - Tião
 Nem Sansão Nem Dalila (1954)
 Matar ou Correr (1954) - Ciscocada
 Malandros em Quarta Dimensão (1954)
 Paixão nas Selvas (1955)
 Depois Eu Conto (1956) - Veludo
 De Pernas Pro Ar (1956) - Faísca
 Com Jeito Vai (1957) - Feijão
 Rio, Zona Norte (1957) - Espírito da Luz
 Pé na Tábua (1957) - Cabeleira
 Metido a Bacana (1957) - Coalhada
 A Baronesa Transviada (1957) - Benedito
 E o Bicho Não Deu (1958) - Jujuba
 É de Chuá (1958) - Laurindo
 Mulher de Fogo (1959)
 Pistoleiro Bossa Nova (1959) - Bartolomeu
 Os três Cangaceiros (1959)
 Mulheres à Vista (1959) - Josafá
 Garota Enxuta (1959) - Otelo
 Entrei de Gaiato (1959) - Himself / Singer in musical number
 Vai que É Mole (1960) - Brancura
 Um Candango na Belacap (1961) - Emanuel Davis Júnior
 O Homem Que Roubou a Copa do Mundo (1961)
 O Dono da Bola (1961) - Himself
 O Assalto ao Trem Pagador (1962) - Cachaça
 Os Cosmonautas (1962) - Zenóbio
 Quero Essa Mulher Assim Mesmo (1963)
 Samba (1965) - Freitas
 Crônica da Cidade Amada (1965) - (segment "Um Pobre Morreu")
 Em Ritmo Jovem (1966)
 Una rosa per tutti (1967)
 Arrastão (1967) - Focinho
 Os Marginais (1968) - (segment "Papo Amarelo")
 Massacre no Supermercado (1968) - Ze Gatinho
 Enfim Sós... Com o Outro (1968) - Anael
 A Doce Mulher Amada (1968) - Leo
 Alibi (1969) - Tranviere
 Macunaíma (1969) - Black Macunaíma / Macunaíma's son
 O Donzelo (1970) - The Taxi Driver
 Os Herdeiros (1970) - Américo
 Se Meu Dólar Falasse (1970) - Tisiu
 Não Aperta, Aparício (1970)
 A Família do Barulho (1970)
 O Barão Otelo no Barato dos Bilhões (1971) - João Otelo dos Anzóis Carapuça
 Cassy Jones, o Magnífico Sedutor (1972)
 O Rei do Baralho (1973)
 O Negrinho do Pastoreio (1973) - Negrinho
 A Estrela Sobe (1974) - Himself
 A Transa do Turfe (1975) - Escovador
 Deixa, Amorzinho... Deixa (1975)
 As Aventuras de Um Detetive Português (1975) - Souza
 O Flagrante (1976)
 Os Pastores da Noite (1976) - Artur
 Tem Alguém na Minha Cama (1976)
 Ladrão de Bagdá (1976)
 Carioca Tigre (1976) - Omero
 Lucio Flavio (1977) - Dondinho
 Ouro Sangrento (1977)
 Ladrões de Cinema (1977)
 A Força do Xangô (1977)
 As Aventuras de Robinson Crusoé (1978) - Sexta-Feira
 A Noiva da Cidade (1978)
 A Noite dos Duros (1978)
 Agonia (1978)
 Asa Branca: Um Sonho Brasileiro (1980)
 Fitzcarraldo (1982) - Station master
 O Homem do Pau-Brasil (1982) - Tovalu
 Parahyba Mulher Macho (1983)
 Quilombo (1984) - Babá
 Exu-Piá, Coração de Macunaíma (1986)
 Jubiabá (1986) - Jubiabá
 Nem Tudo é Verdade (1986)
 Running Out of Luck (1987)
 Brasa Adormecida (1987)
 Natal da Portela (1988) - Seu Napoleão
 Jardim de Alah (1988)
 A Paz É Dourada (1989)
 Escolinha do Professor Raimundo (1990, TV Series) - Eustáquio
 Boca de Ouro (1990)

References

External links 
 

1915 births
1993 deaths
20th-century Brazilian male actors
People from Uberlândia
Afro-Brazilian male actors
Brazilian male film actors